The list of shipwrecks in 1913 includes ships sunk, foundered, grounded, or otherwise lost during 1913.

January

1 January

3 January

4 January

7 January

10 January

12 January

13 January

14 January

16 January

20 January

21 January

22 January

24 January

February

1 February

2 February

3 February

7 February

8 February

10 February

13 February

15 February

16 February

26 February

Unknown date

March

1 March

3 March

6 March

7 March

10 March

21 March

26 March

27 March

Unknown date

April

2 April

7 April

15 April

16 April

18 April

19 April

20 April

21 April

27 April

28 April

Unknown date

May

1 May

2 May

11 May

13 May

23 May

24 May

26 May

30 May

June

6 June

7 June

11 June

13 June

15 June

16 June

17 June

18 June

21 June

24 June

Unknown date

July

5 July

6 July

7 July

8 July

9 July

10 July

12 July

13 July

15 July

20 July

21 July

25 July

26 July

Unknown date

August

1 August

7 August

10 August

14 August

15 August

16 August

17 August

25 August

26 August

27 August

28 August

30 August

September

2 September

3 September

6 September

7 September

9 September

20 September

22 September

23 September

24 September

27 September

28 September

October

5 October

6 October

9 October

10 October

11 October

12 October

13 October

15 October

17 October

19 October

20 October

21 October

23 October

25 October

26 October

30 October

Unknown date

November

1 November

2 November

4 November

8 November

9 November

10 November

11 November

12 November

19 November

22 November

24 November

26 November

26 November

Unknown date

December

1 December

2 December

5 December

10 December

12 December

15 December

19 December

22 December

23 December

26 December

28 December

Unknown date

References

Source

External links
 General Concha photo & description (in Spanish)

1913
 
Ships